The Battle of Diersheim (20–21 April 1797) saw a First French Republic army led by Jean Victor Marie Moreau clash with a Habsburg army commanded by Anton Count Sztáray de Nagy-Mihaly. Though both sides suffered about 3,000 casualties in the bitter fighting, the Austrians finally retreated with the loss of 13 artillery pieces. Austrian General Wilhelm von Immens was killed and Sztáray badly wounded. The combat at Diersheim was a waste of lives because Napoleon Bonaparte signed the Preliminaries of Leoben with Austria a few days earlier, calling for a truce. However, Moreau's reputation was enhanced by his hard-won victory which occurred during the War of the First Coalition, part of the French Revolutionary Wars. Diersheim is one of a number of villages that make up the municipality of Rheinau.

References

Diersheim

Conflicts in 1797
Battles of the French Revolutionary Wars
Battles of the War of the First Coalition
Battles involving Austria
Battles involving France
1797 in Austria
1797 in France
1797 in the Holy Roman Empire
Battles in Baden-Württemberg
Battles inscribed on the Arc de Triomphe